The 1900 Buchtel football team represented Buchtel College in the 1900 college football season. The team did not have a coach; their captains were Edson Robinson and Hugh Price. Buchtel was outscored by their opponents by a total of 55–66.

Schedule

References

Buchtel
Akron Zips football seasons
Buchtel football